PEVA may refer to:
Poly (ethylene-vinyl acetate)
Performance Evaluation
Pes equinovarus adductus or club foot